Yi (Ї ї; italics: Ї ї) is a letter of the Cyrillic script. Yi is derived from the Greek letter iota with diaeresis.

It was the initial variant of the Cyrillic letter Іі, which saw change from two dots to one in 18th century, possibly inspired by similar Latin letter i. Later two variants of the letter separated to become distinct letters in the Ukrainian alphabet.

As the historical variant of the Cyrillic Іі it represented either /i/ (as i in pizza) or /j/ (as y in yen).

In various romanization systems of Ukrainian, ї is represented by Latin letters i or yi (word-initially), yi, ji, or even ï.

It was formerly also used in the Serbian Cyrillic alphabet in the late 1700s and early 1800s, where it represented the sound ; in this capacity, it was introduced by Dositej Obradović but eventually replaced with the modern letter ј by Vuk Stefanović Karadžić.

In Ukrainian, the letter was introduced as part of the Zhelekhivka orthography, in Yevhen Zhelekhivsky's Ukrainian–German dictionary (2 volumes, 1885–86).

Related letters and other similar characters
Ӥ ӥ : Cyrillic letter I with diaeresis
Ï ï : Latin letter I with diaeresis
Ι ι : Greek letter Ι
Ј ј : Cyrillic letter J
Ι ι : Greek letter Iota

Computing codes

References

External links

Cyrillic letters
Ukrainian language